Tracy Vilar (born Tracy Leigh Vilar April 12, 1968;  and sometimes credited Tracy Villars) is an American actress.

Career
She is best known for her roles as Ro-Ro on the CBS sitcom Partners,  Sophia Ortiz on The WB sitcom The Steve Harvey Show,  and Angela de la Cruz on the TNT television show, Saved.

Filmography

Film

Television

Awards and nominations
In 1996, Tracy was nominated for Outstanding Individual Performance in a Comedy Series for her role as Sophia Ortiz in The Steve Harvey Show at the NCLR Bravo Awards. In 1998, she was nominated for Outstanding Actress in a Comedy Series in the same role at the ALMA Awards. That same year, she won the Margo Albert Award for Most Promising Actress.

References

External links

Living people
1968 births
Hispanic and Latino American actresses
American film actresses
American television actresses
Actresses from New York City
20th-century American actresses
21st-century American actresses